William J. Murray III (born May 25, 1946) is an American author, Baptist minister, and social conservative lobbyist who serves as the chairman of the Religious Freedom Coalition, a non-profit organization in Washington, D.C. It lobbies Congress on issues related to aiding Christians in Islamic and Communist countries.

The son of the late Madalyn Murray O'Hair, known as an atheist activist, Murray was named as the plaintiff in his mother's challenge to mandatory prayer and Bible reading in public schools. After it was consolidated and heard as Abington School District v. Schempp (1963), the US Supreme Court ruled that mandatory Bible reading was unconstitutional. After becoming a Christian in 1980, Murray published a memoir, My Life Without God (1982), about his spiritual journey.

Biography
William J. Murray III (known as Bill) was born in Ohio in 1946, after his mother Madalyn Mays Roths had returned from service in Italy during World War II. His father was William J. Murray Jr., a married Catholic officer with whom Madalyn had an affair while they were both stationed in Italy. Though Murray refused to get a divorce and marry Madalyn, she divorced her husband, changed her surname to Murray, and named her newborn son William J. Murray, after his father.

Madalyn moved with the baby to Baltimore, where her mother and brother lived. In 1954, Bill's half-brother Jon Garth Murray was born. When Bill was still a child, Madalyn started hosting Socialist Labor party meetings and encouraged him to attend so he could "learn the 'truth' about capitalism." Madalyn became an atheist activist when the boys were still young and attending public school. In 1960, after returning with her two boys to the United States from a trip to Paris during which she unsuccessfully applied for immigration to the Soviet Union, she brought Bill to the local junior high to enroll him in classes and was incensed to see the students praying during class. After various attempts to prevent Bill's attendance during prayer and Bible reading time, Madalyn gained national attention when she filed a lawsuit challenging the practice of compulsory prayer and Bible reading in public schools as unconstitutional, naming Bill as plaintiff. The Murrays' case, Murray v. Curlett, was folded into Abington School District v. Schempp before the Supreme Court of the United States heard the issues. In 1963, it ruled that mandatory Bible reading in public schools was unconstitutional. The year before it had overturned the practice of mandatory prayers in public schools.

Murray later worked in various industries in the private sector, including the airline industry. He had a daughter, Robin, with his high school girlfriend, who stayed with his family after running away from home.

In 1980, Murray became a Christian. Learning of his conversion, his mother commented: "One could call this a postnatal abortion on the part of a mother, I guess; I repudiate him entirely and completely for now and all times. He is beyond human forgiveness." He became a Baptist minister.  He and his mother Madalyn Murray O'Hair were estranged by his action, as he was from his daughter and brother, who shared his mother's household and were deeply involved with the American Atheists organization. O'Hair had legally adopted Robin.

In 1995, his mother, daughter Robin, and half-brother Jon disappeared from their home and office. It was learned that they were kidnapped, held for about a month, and subject to extortion of $600,000 before they were killed in a remote area outside Austin, Texas. Their bodies were not found until January 2001. The plot was led by David Roland Waters, an ex-convict and former employee of the American Atheists, who had been fired for theft of $54,000; and two accomplices.

Bibliography
  My Life Without God. Harvest House Publishers, 1982 .
  The Church Is Not for Perfect People Harvest House Publishers, 1987 
  Let Us Pray: A Plea for Prayer in Our Schools 1995 
  Stop the Y2K Madness! 1999 
  The Pledge: One Nation Under God. AMG 2007, . Freeware written by Todd Akin
  Utopian Road to Hell: Enslaving America and the World with Central Planning WND Books 2016 ,

References

External links
 Religion Freedom Coalition - Official RFC website
 Government is Not God - William J. Murray's blog

1946 births
Living people
Baptist ministers from the United States
Converts to Protestantism from atheism or agnosticism